Bulgana Green Power Hub is a wind farm north of Stawell in the Australian state of Victoria. The project is owned by Neoen. Construction of the 56 wind turbines, with a total generation capacity of 194MW, was completed in August 2019, and connections to the national grid reached full capacity in 2021.

90% of the energy is contracted for supply to the  Government of Victoria. The  contract and 25 years of maintenance is with Siemens Gamesa Renewable Energy.

References

Wind farms in Victoria (Australia)